BelKA (an acronym from Belarusian: Беларускі Касмічны Апарат, Belarusian Cosmic Apparatus) was intended to be the first satellite of independent Belarus.

Satellite
It was a remote sensing satellite that utilizes the USP (satellite bus), developed by Belarusian researchers and Russian Rocket and Space Corporation RSC Energia for National Academy of Sciences of the Republic of Belarus as the final customer of the satellite, which had the capacity to take photos of the Earth surface, with a maximum resolution of 2-2.5 meters.

BelKA was launched, along with seventeen other satellites, on July 26, 2006 at 19:43 GMT, however 86 seconds later, the Dnepr rocket suffered an engine failure and crashed, destroying the satellites.

The name BelKA is thought to be an allusion to the Soviet space dog, Belka, who, together with Strelka orbited the Earth and returned safely on Sputnik 5 in 1960.

 Configuration: Victoria bus
 Outcome: Carrier rocket failure, satellite destroyed

References

Earth imaging satellites
Spacecraft launched in 2006
Satellites of Belarus
Spacecraft launched by Dnepr rockets
Satellite launch failures
2006 in Belarus
Space accidents and incidents in Kazakhstan